Makeen or Makin is a city in South Waziristan, Khyber Pakhtunkhwa, Pakistan, on the boundary with North Waziristan. Makeen lies within the heartland of the Mahsud tribe of Pashtuns.

Makin Subdivision has seven middle schools (including two for girls), and two high schools (none for girls).

History

British Raj
In the late 19th century, Makeen was a center of the rebellion movement and guerilla warfare led by Mulla Powinda, a Pashtun tribal leader, against the colonial army of the British Raj.

In 1919-1920, the Waziristan revolt was sparked by the Third Anglo-Afghan War. The military operation against the Mahsuds was led by Lieutenant William Kenny, who was killed during action at Kotkai, which lies to the southeast of Makeen. He received a posthumous Victoria Cross for his gallantry, the highest award of the British honours system. One aspect of this campaign was the effective use of air power in Waziristan by the British Indian Army. The Mahsuds took heavy casualties during the fighting at Ahnai Tangi and it was these casualties, as well as the destruction of their villages a month later by bombers of the Royal Air Force, that temporarily subdued the Mahsuds. Throughout 1921–1924, the British Indians undertook a road construction effort in the region that led to further conflict during the 1921–1924 campaign. 

In 1925, the British Royal Air Force carried out the Pink's War bombing campaign under the command of Wing Commander Richard Pink against the Mahsuds. After over 50 days of bombing, the tribal leaders sought peace to end the bombing, bringing the campaign to a close. Pink's War was the first air action of the Royal Air Force carried out independent of the British Army or Royal Navy. Conflict flared up again in 1936 as the Mahsuds and other tribes joined the uprising led by Faqir Ipi (Mirzali Khan) against the British, resulting in another campaign that lasted until 1939.

War on terror
In 2007, Makeen became the hotbed for terrorist activities by Baitullah Mehsud, leader of the militant group Tehrik-i-Taliban Pakistan. According to Pakistani officials and his aides, he had hundreds of trained fedayeen ready to kill themselves as suicide bombers upon his instructions. According to a United Nations report released in September 2007, he was responsible for almost 80% of suicide bombings in Afghanistan.

On 28 December 2007, Baitullah was in Makeen when he allegedly claimed responsibility for the assassination of Benazir Bhutto in Rawalpindi during a phone call intercepted by the Pakistani intelligence officials. A United Nations report on Benazir, however, stated that the government was quick to blame him and that she potentially faced threats "from elements in the Pakistani establishment" itself. In February 2009, a US drone strike targeted three compounds allegedly used by Baitullah and killed over 30 people, while two vehicles were destroyed in a March 2009 drone strike. Reporter David Rohde of The New York Times, his interpreter Tahir Ludin, and their driver Asadullah Mangal, who had been kidnapped outside Kabul by the Taliban in November 2008, were being kept in Makeen during the March 2009 drone strike. Rohde reported that the area "teemed with Uzbek, Arab, Afghan and Pakistani militants." After the drone strike, the Taliban arrested and executed a local man accused of spying, whose decapitated body was hung in Makeen's bazaar. Baitullah also survived a June 2009 US airstrike which killed over 60 people in Makeen, but in August 2009, another US drone strike succeeded to kill him and his wife.

Makeen was a target of Operation Rah-e-Nijat in 2009, a major ground-air offensive by the Pakistan Army against Tehrik-i-Taliban Pakistan, due to which thousands of families fled to IDP camps in Tank and Dera Ismail Khan. On 6 November 2009, the Pakistani military entered and cleared a large part of Makeen.

Contemporary history
Makeen was the birthplace of Naqeebullah Mehsud, who was killed on 13 January 2018 during a fake police encounter staged by the police officer Rao Anwar in Karachi. The Pashtun Tahafuz Movement (PTM), under the leadership of Manzoor Pashteen, launched a campaign to seek justice for Naqeebullah Mehsud after his murder.

Climate
With a warm and temperate climate, Makeen features a subtropical highland climate with uniform rainfall (Cfb) under the Köppen climate classification. The average temperature in Makeen is 12.3 °C, while the annual precipitation averages 1,079 mm. There is a lot of precipitation even in the drier months. December is the driest month with 21 mm of precipitation, while July, the wettest month, has an average rainfall of 201 mm.

June is the warmest month of the year with an average temperature of 20.9 °C. The coldest month January has an average temperature of 0.9 °C.

Notable people
Mulla Powinda
Naqeebullah Mehsud

References

Populated places in South Waziristan